The Partners is an American sitcom that aired on September 18, 1971, through September 8, 1972, on NBC.

Synopsis
The program featured Don Adams and Rupert Crosse  as bumbling detectives, John Doucette their exasperated commanding officer. Dick Van Patten played the sycophantic desk sergeant.  Robert Karvelas had a recurring role as Freddie, who compulsively confessed to crimes he did not commit.

The pilot featured guest appearances by Joey Forman, Art Metrano, and Yvonne Craig.

Production notes
Unlike many television programs of its day, The Partners eschewed a traditional opening title sequence.  The opening credits were merely interspersed during the first few minutes, akin to the technique that has become quite commonplace today. The theme music, which accompanied the closing credits and occasionally popped up during the program itself, was composed by Lalo Schifrin, best known for the theme to Mission: Impossible.

Characters
Unlike many other sitcoms of the 1960s and 70s, there is no family seen in the show. There are not many characters altogether.

Detective Lennie Crooke: (Don Adams) Det. Lennie Crooke is a slightly inept police detective, a bit similar to Adams' previous character on Get Smart, Maxwell Smart. Details on his life and family are very sparse. He has mentioned on one or two occasions that he has acrophobia, the fear of heights, and he was never in Korea, according to his statement in the pilot episode, Here Come The Fuzz. He has a likelihood to forget things that no other sane detective would forget, including his pants. He is not married and we do see inside his apartment on one or two occasions. It appears to be very neat with every personal item in its own place. He isn't too intelligent and is prone to get everyone in a room confused in his attempts to carry on an intelligent conversation. He tends to dislike the desk sergeant Higgenbottem, who in turn doesn't seem to like Lennie. The two will argue about anything, such as how "It's not true that George let me escape but it is true that I locked George in the closet, so when I said it was true, I was referring to how it wasn't true that that was true" or how "They stole 13 cars in the last two weeks and that makes 14 if you count our car, but then they stole our other car which would make it 15 but then the car we found in the driveway  takes it back to down to 14."  To which Higgenbottem will reply, "No, I'm counting both your cars and that car because whether you found it or not it was originally stolen and I'm also counting the Rolls-Royce so that makes 16." And then Lennie will continue to argue that he had forgotten the Rolls-Royce and that made it 15 again, and so they would go on until Captain Andrews put a stop to it. The two seem to rather enjoy these comical arguments, in fact. Lennie was in every episode.

Detective George Robinson: (Rupert Crosse) George is Lennie's best friend, longtime partner, and sarcastic steadying force. He was in every episode. He is a tall black man, prone to roll his eyes and shake his head at Lenny and his antics, and even less is known about him. He was in Korea, and while he has no fear of heights, he often does seem to have a fear of Lennie's driving. He notices things that go right over his partner's head, and he is the one that keeps Lennie, and sometimes Higgenbottem, from making complete fools of themselves. He doesn't seem to have a very large affinity for Higgenbottem, in fact in the pilot episode when Higgenbottom was reading the report on what the two partners had messed up, and was continually adding in pieces to the sentence that were charging the two with worse crimes, George offered to 'make a suggestion that might help the situation.' -- "Ask Higgenbottem to leave the room."

Captain Aaron William Andrews: (John Doucette) Captain Andrews is a sarcastic police captain, the boss of Lennie and George, who plays a role similar to that of the one Ed Platt played in Get Smart, as The Chief of CONTROL. He really does like Lennie and George in spite of his many sarcastic statements. A good example of his sarcasm: Higgenbottem, whom he is friends with, bursts into the room exclaiming that they have a "code 64," Lennie tells him to take it to the animal shelter because that's a lost dog. "No, that's a code 65." Higgenbottem said. "Oh, of course," Lennie answered, "I was confusing it with a code 63--" "Which is someone being assaulted," corrected Higginbottem, as Captain Andrews exclaimed, looking pointedly at Lenny, "And we may have one in this room at any moment!"

Sgt. Nelson Higgenbottem.: (Dick Van Patten) The sycophantic desk Sergeant Higgenbottom is a small man who loves any chance to grate on Lennie's nerves and enjoys arguing with Lennie as well, only tolerates George but still looks for chances to annoy him too, and who does whatever Captain Andrews asks, and generally sides with him. Lennie has a habit of starting a sentence off with "Well, at least there's one good thing that came out of this..." after he's done something stupid. Higgenbottem always answers the same way, saying eagerly, "You're leaving the force?"

Freddie Butler: Don Adams' real life cousin, Robert Karvelas, who played Agent Larabee on Get Smart, played Freddie Butler, who was in seven episodes. He is always chronically confessing to other people's crimes, and consistently manages to drive Lennie, George, and Higgenbottem and Captain Andrews crazy. When he appears, Lennie usually exclaims, "Just what I can't stand right now, Freddie Butler!"

Reception
NBC had exceptionally high hopes for the series after it performed well with test audiences. However, it failed to find a large enough audience because it aired Saturday nights at 8:00pm—right up against the highest-rated show on television, CBS's All in the Family. (Originally, CBS had scheduled My Three Sons against The Partners, but substituted All in the Family at the last minute.) After their January 8, 1972, broadcasts, NBC removed both The Partners and fellow freshman sitcom The Good Life from its schedule. (The move worked out for the network, as they were replaced with the medical drama Emergency!, which was a hit and ran six seasons.) Fifteen episodes of the show had aired by January; five more would be "burned off" in the summer of 1972. The show ranked 66th out of 78 shows that season with an average 12.5 rating.

The Partners has never been officially released on home video, but several websites offer low-quality bootleg DVDs of the series.

Episodes

References

External links

1971 American television series debuts
1972 American television series endings
1970s American police comedy television series
1970s American sitcoms
English-language television shows
NBC original programming
Television series by Universal Television
Television shows set in Los Angeles